The 2000–01 BBL season, the 14th since its establishment of the British Basketball League, commenced on 30 September 2000 and ended on 7 April 2001, with a total of 13 teams competing. The regular season saw teams split into two geographically divided Conferences, seven in the North and six in the South, with northern teams playing 36 games and southern teams playing 34 games each. Sheffield Sharks were crowned winners of the North, while London Towers dominated the South, both teams tallying 27 wins in the regular season.

Played in parallel with the regular season, the BBL’s peripheral competition the uni-ball Trophy was conquered by Chester Jets, after a 92-81 win against Newcastle Eagles. Teams also contested the NTL National Cup with clubs from the lower placed National Basketball League, with Leicester Riders prevailing in a close final against Greater London Leopards.

Following the regular season, the top-four teams from each Conference progressed to the play-offs which ran from 14 April to 5 May, climaxing with the Play-off Final at Wembley Arena. Leicester Riders shocked bookmakers and fans alike, taking the Championship title with an 84-75 victory over Sheffield, adding to their National Cup success.

London Towers was the league’s sole representative in European competition, appearing in the Euroleague. They failed to make the Round of 16, finishing 5th in the 6-team Group D with a 1-9 record.

Notable occurrences 
 London Towers opened their campaign in the Euroleague with an 86-61 win against the Frankfurt Skyliners on 18 October 2000. Kendrick Warren posted a game-high 21 points for the Towers.
 On 6 November, Derby Storm's 104-84 home victory over Edinburgh Rocks ended the BBL’s longest ever losing streak, with Storm’s last league win coming on 26 March, an 88-91 victory away to Milton Keynes Lions.
 Greater London Leopards undertook a mid-season tour of the United States throughout November, playing some of the top college teams in the country, finishing with a 2-3 record.
 Birmingham Bullets’ attempt to sign Panamanian Antonio García, after he walked out on Derby a day earlier, was taken to court after Derby refused to release his registration.
 Leicester Riders were crowned NTL National Cup champions on 7 January 2001, with an 84-82 win over Greater London Leopards at the Sheffield Arena ending a 30-year hunt for silverware.
 The Northern Conference conquered in the annual All-Star Game, with a 161-148 victory over their Southern counterparts at the Telewest Arena on 20 January. Newcastle Eagles’ Tony Windless was voted MVP after scoring 25 points, while Thames Valley Tigers’ Tony Christie posted a game-high 29 points for the South.
 Chester Jets won the uni-ball Trophy on 24 March, with a 92-81 win against Newcastle at the National Indoor Arena in Birmingham. The celebrations were even more noticeable after Chester coach Robbie Peers and the Jets team performed a conga-line around the court. Jets' Pero Cameron was named as MVP.
 Leicester claimed their second piece of silverware for the season, adding the Play-off title to their earlier National Cup victory. Riders claimed the win on 5 May at Wembley Arena with an 84-75 victory over Sheffield Sharks, shooting an overall 57% from the floor. Larry Johnson was named as MVP.

BBL Championship (Tier 1)

Final standings

Northern Conference

Southern Conference

The play-offs

1st round

Quarter-finals

Semi-finals

Final

National League Conference (Tier 2)

Final standings 

+ one point deducted
Play Off Final - Plymouth 83 Worthing 77

National League Division 1 (Tier 3)

Final standings 

Play Off Final - Reading 97 Oxford 82

National League Division 2 (Tier 4)

Final standings 

Play Off Final - Ealing v Derbyshire 82-81

National League Division 3 (Tier 5)

Final standings 
{| class="wikitable" style="margin:1em auto; text-align: center;"
|-
!Pos!!scope="col" style="width: 180px;"|Team!!Pld!!W!!L!!%!!Pts
|- style="background: #ffffcc;"
|1 ||style="text-align:left;"| Bristol Bombers
|| 22 || 20 || 2 ||0.909||40
|- style="background: #ccffcc;"
|2 ||style="text-align:left;"| Worcester Wolves
|| 22 || 18 || 4 ||0.818||36 
|- style="background: #ccffcc;"
|3 ||style="text-align:left;"| Thames Valley Tigers II
|| 22 || 18 || 4 ||0.818||36 
|- style="background: #ccffcc;"
|4 ||style="text-align:left;"| Dudley Bears
|| 22 || 12 || 10 ||0.545||24 
|- style="background: #ccffcc;"
|5 ||style="text-align:left;"| Barking & Dag. Erkenwald
|| 22 || 11 || 11 ||0.500||22 
|- style="background: #ccffcc;"
|6 ||style="text-align:left;"| Nottingham College
|| 22 || 11 || 11 ||0.500||22
|- style="background: #ccffcc;"
|7 ||style="text-align:left;"| Brighton Cougars
|| 22 || 11 || 11 ||0.500||22 
|- style="background: #ccffcc;"
|8 ||style="text-align:left;"| University of Birmingham
|| 22 || 10 || 12 ||0.455||20 
|- style="background: ;"
|9 ||style="text-align:left;"| Northumbria University
|| 22 || 8 || 14 ||0.364||16 
|- style="background: ;"
|10 ||style="text-align:left;"| Tamar Valley Cannons
|| 22 || 6 || 16 ||0.273||12 
|- style="background: ;"
|11 ||style="text-align:left;"| Derby Storm II
|| 22 || 3 || 19 ||0.136||6 
|- style="background: ;"
|12 ||style="text-align:left;"| Colchester Alliance
|| 22 || 3 || 19 ||0.136||''6  
|}

 NTL National Cup 

 Last 16 

 Quarter-finals 

 Semi-finals 

 Final 

 uni-ball Trophy 

 Group stage 
Group A
 Sheffield qualified as the third-place team with the best record on basket difference.
Group B
 Derby qualified ahead of Birmingham on head-to-head results, losing 76-74 and winning 106-90.
Group C
 London Towers received a bye into the Quarter-finals, due to scheduling conflicts with their Euroleague campaign.

 Quarter-finals 

 Semi-finals 

 Final 

 All-Star Game 

 Statistics leaders 

 Seasonal awards 

 Most Valuable Player: Loren Meyer (Chester Jets)
 Coach of the Year: Robbie Peers (Chester Jets)
 All-Star First Team: Loren Meyer (Chester Jets)
 Kendrick Warren (London Towers)
 Steve Bucknall (London Towers)
 Tony Windless (Newcastle Eagles)
 John McCord (Thames Valley Tigers)
 All-Star Second Team:'''
 James Hamilton (Chester Jets)
 Nate Reinking (Sheffield Sharks)
 Barry Bowman (Derby Storm)
 Nigel Lloyd (Milton Keynes Lions)
 Terrell Myers (Sheffield Sharks)

References 

British Basketball League seasons
1
British